The men's 200 metres T51 event at the 2020 Summer Paralympics in Tokyo, took place on 31 August 2021.

Records
Prior to the competition, the existing records were as follows:

Results
The final took place on 31 August 2021, at 10:18:

References

Men's 200 metres T51
2021 in men's athletics